Julian Amado Azaad (born 26 December 1990) is an Argentine beach volleyball player. He competed in the 2020 Summer Olympics.

References

External links

1990 births
Living people
Sportspeople from Rosario, Santa Fe
Sportspeople from Santa Fe, Argentina
Beach volleyball players at the 2020 Summer Olympics
Argentine beach volleyball players
Olympic beach volleyball players of Argentina
Pan American Games medalists in volleyball
Pan American Games bronze medalists for Argentina
Beach volleyball players at the 2019 Pan American Games
Medalists at the 2019 Pan American Games